Artur Gruzdev (born 15 December 1998) is an Estonian ice dancer. With his former skating partner, Viktoria Semenjuk, he has competed in the final segment at two World Junior Championships (2018, 2019). They placed tenth at the 2016 Winter Youth Olympics.

Programs

With Bunina

With Semenjuk

Competitive highlights 
CS: Challenger Series; JGP: Junior Grand Prix

With Azroian for Armenia

With Bunina for Estonia

With Semenjuk for Estonia

With Stepanova for Estonia

References 

–== External links ==
 
 

1998 births
Living people
Estonian male ice dancers
Figure skaters from Tallinn
Figure skaters at the 2016 Winter Youth Olympics
Competitors at the 2023 Winter World University Games